Miguel Calmon is a municipality in the state of Bahia in the North-East region of Brazil.

The municipality contains the  Sete Passagens State Park, created in 2000.

Notable people
 Andreson Dourado Ribas, footballer

See also
List of municipalities in Bahia

References

Municipalities in Bahia